Kaistia geumhonensis is a bacterium from the genus of Kaistia which has been isolated from river sediments from the Geumho River in Korea.

References

External links
Type strain of Kaistia geumhonensis at BacDive -  the Bacterial Diversity Metadatabase	

Hyphomicrobiales
Bacteria described in 2011